Henry Pierce Stapp (born March 23, 1928 in Cleveland, Ohio) is an American mathematical physicist, known for his work in quantum mechanics, particularly the development of axiomatic S-matrix theory, the proofs of strong nonlocality properties, and the place of free will in the "orthodox" quantum mechanics of John von Neumann.

Biography

Stapp received his PhD in particle physics at the University of California, Berkeley, under the supervision of Nobel Laureates Emilio Segrè and Owen Chamberlain.

In 1958, Stapp was invited by Wolfgang Pauli to ETH Zurich to work with him personally on basic problems in quantum mechanics.  When Pauli died in December 1958, Stapp studied von Neumann's book, and on the basis of that work composed an article entitled "Mind, Matter and Quantum Mechanics", which was not submitted for publication; but the title became the title of his 1993 book.

In 1969 Stapp was invited by Werner Heisenberg to work with him at the Max Planck Institute in Munich.

In 1976 Stapp was invited by J.A. Wheeler to work with him on problems in the foundations of Quantum Mechanics. Dr. Stapp has published many papers pertaining to the non-local aspects of quantum mechanics and Bell's theorem, including  
two books published by Springer-Verlag, and a third one in progress.

Stapp has worked also in a number of conventional areas of high energy physics, including analysis of the scattering of polarized protons, parity violation, and S-matrix theory.

Research
Some of Stapp's work concerns the implications of quantum mechanics (QM). He has argued for the relevance of QM to consciousness and free will.

Stapp favors the idea that quantum wave functions collapse only when they interact with consciousness as a consequence of "orthodox" quantum mechanics. He argues that quantum wave functions collapse when conscious minds select one among the alternative quantum possibilities. His hypothesis of how mind may interact with matter via quantum processes in the brain differs from that of Penrose and Hameroff. While they postulate quantum computing in the microtubules in brain neurons, Stapp postulates a more global collapse, a 'mind like' wave-function collapse that exploits certain aspects of the quantum Zeno effect within the synapses. Stapp's view of the neural correlate of attention is explained in his book, Mindful Universe: Quantum Mechanics and the Participating Observer (2007). Stapp has claimed that consciousness is fundamental to the universe.

In this book he credits John von Neumann's Mathematical Foundations of Quantum Mechanics (1955, 1932) with providing an "orthodox" quantum mechanics demonstrating mathematically the essential role of quantum physics in the mind. Stapp has taken interest in the work of Alfred North Whitehead. He has proposed what he calls a "revised Whiteheadianism". He has also written a chapter "Whiteheadian Process and Quantum Theory" (pp. 92–102) in the book Physics and Whitehead: Quantum, Process, and Experience (2003).

His philosophy has been described as being influenced by both Heisenberg's physical realism and Bohr's idealism. A form of panpsychism        Philosopher Gordon Globus noted that "Stapp unhesitatingly descends into panexperientialism". Stapp has co-authored papers with Jeffrey M. Schwartz. Schwartz has connected the work of Stapp with the concept of "mental force" and spiritual practices of Buddhism.

Reception

Stapp's work has drawn criticism from scientists such as David Bourget and Danko Georgiev. Recent papers and a book by Georgiev criticize Stapp's model in two aspects: (1) The mind in Stapp's model does not have its own wavefunction or density matrix, but nevertheless can act upon the brain using projection operators. Such usage is not compatible with standard quantum mechanics because one can attach any number of ghostly minds to any point in space that act upon physical quantum systems with any projection operators. Therefore, Stapp's model does not build upon "the prevailing principles of physics", but negates them. (2) Stapp's claim that quantum Zeno effect is robust against environmental decoherence directly contradicts a basic theorem in quantum information theory according to which acting with projection operators upon the density matrix of a quantum system can never decrease the Von Neumann entropy of the system, but can only increase it. Stapp has responded to Bourget and Georgiev stating that the allegations of errors are incorrect.

Selected publications
Stapp, H; Schwartz, J. M; Beauregard, M. (2005). Quantum theory in neuroscience and psychology: A neurophysical model of mind-brain interaction. Philosophical Transactions of the Royal Society of London, Series B. 360 (1458): 1309-1327. Full paper
Stapp, H; Schwartz, J. M; Beauregard, M. (2004). The volitional influence of the mind on the brain, with special reference to emotional self-regulation. In Beauregard, M. (Ed.). Consciousness, emotional self-regulation, and the brain, Philadelphia, PA: John Benjamins Publishing Company, Chapter 7. 
Stapp, H. (2009). Mind, Matter and Quantum Mechanics (The Frontiers Collection). Springer. 
Stapp, H. (2011). Mindful Universe: Quantum Mechanics and the Participating Observer. Springer. 
Stapp, H. (2017). Quantum Theory and Free Will: How Mental Intentions Translate into Bodily Actions. Springer.

See also
Epistemological Letters
Consciousness causes collapse
 Quantum mind
Quantum Zeno effect

References

Further reading
Donald, M. On the Work of Henry P. Stapp. 
Streater, R. F. Quantum Theory on the Brain.
Ludwig, K. (1995). Why the Difference Between Quantum and Classical Physics is Irrelevant to the Mind/Body Problem. Psyche 2 (16).

External links
List of papers by Stapp on LBNL server
Stapp at the Chopra Foundation

1928 births
American consciousness researchers and theorists
Living people
Quantum mind
Quantum physicists
University of California, Berkeley alumni
University of Michigan alumni
American mathematicians